Sharon Creech (born July 29, 1945) is an American writer of children's novels. She was the first American winner of the Carnegie Medal for British children's books and the first person to win both the American Newbery Medal and the British Carnegie.

Biography
Sharon Creech was born in South Euclid, Ohio, a suburb of Cleveland, where she grew up with her parents (Ann and Arvel), one sister (Sandy), and three brothers (Dennis, Doug and Tom). She often used to visit her cousins in Quincy, Lewis County, Kentucky, which has found its way into many of her books as fictional Bybanks, Kentucky. Bybanks appears in Walk Two Moons, Chasing Redbird, and Bloomability and there is an allusion to Bybanks in The Wanderer.

At college in the U.S. she became intrigued by story-telling after taking literature and writing courses, and she later became a teacher of secondary school English and Writing in England and Switzerland. Her first children's novel Absolutely Normal Chaos was published only in the U.K., by Macmillan Children's Books in 1990. Called "comedy about contemporary teen life" by Kirkus Reviews, it featured a 13-year-old girl's "complete and unabridged journal for English class".
Her first book published in the U.S. was Walk Two Moons (1994), which won the American Newbery Medal in 1995. Later that year, Absolutely Normal Chaos was first published in the U.S. by HarperCollins —set in her hometown Euclid, Ohio.

Creech returned to the U.S. in 1998 after 18 years abroad. She is married to Lyle Rigg, a headmaster in New Jersey, and has two grown children, Rob and Karin.

Books 
She has written both novels and picture books. She often embeds serious topics into her stories, including such themes as independence, trust, childhood, adulthood, and death, often using humour to soften them.

Books such as Love That Dog and Heartbeat were written in verse, whereas other books like Ruby Holler and Walk Two Moons are in a narrative style.

Bloomability (1998) features an American girl at a boarding school in Switzerland. The setting was inspired by The American School In Switzerland, where Creech taught English.

She returned to the fictional school exercise in Love That Dog (Harper Collins and Bloomsbury, 2001), the blank verse diary of "Jack, a reluctant student, [who] resists poetry assignments from his teacher, Miss Stretchberry." It was a commended runner-up for the British Carnegie Medal.

Awards
In 1995, Walk Two Moons won the Newbery Medal from the American Library Association, recognizing the year's best children's book by an American author. In the U.K., it won the annual Children's Book Award for long novels, voted by children, and the Reading Association Award. In 1997, it also won the Literaturhaus Award, Austria, and the Young Adult Sequoyah Award, Oklahoma, USA .

Bloomability won the IRA/CBC Children's Choices award in 1999.

The Wanderer won the Parents' Choice Award, USA, in 2000, and it was a runner-up for the Newbery Medal. It was one of eight books on the Carnegie Medal shortlist in the U.K.

Creech and Love That Dog were a commended runner-up for the 2001 Carnegie Medal and she won the 2002 Medal from the British librarians, recognizing Ruby Holler as the year's best children's book published in the U.K.

Works

 1990 The Recital, novel for adults, published as Sharon Rigg
 1991 Nickel Malley, novel for adults, published as Sharon Rigg
 1992 The Center of the Universe: Waiting for the Girl, play
 1990 Absolutely Normal Chaos
 1994 Walk Two Moons
 1996 Pleasing the Ghost
 1997 Chasing Redbird
 1998 Bloomability
 2000 Fishing in the Air
 2000  The Wanderer
 2001 Love That Dog
 2001 A Fine, Fine School 
 2002 Ruby Holler
 2003 Granny Torrelli Makes Soup
 2004  Heartbeat
 2005  Replay
 2006 Who's That Baby
 2007 The Castle Corona (Illustrated by David Diaz)
 2008 Hate That Cat
 2009 The Unfinished Angel
 2012 The Great Unexpected
 2013 The Boy on the Porch
 2016 Moo
 2018 Saving Winslow

Notes

References

External links

 
 
 

American children's writers
Carnegie Medal in Literature winners
Newbery Honor winners
Newbery Medal winners
Hiram College alumni
People from South Euclid, Ohio
Writers from Ohio
Writers from New Jersey
1945 births
Living people